The following is a list of characters that first appeared in the New Zealand soap opera Shortland Street in 2002, by order of first appearance.

Delphi Greenlaw

Delphine "Delphi" Greenlaw made her debut on 22 March 2002 as the younger sister of Geoff (Andrew Laing) and Anne Greenlaw (Emmeline Hawthorne). A tomboy, Delphi was shown to prefer Rugby over fashion and entered a whirlwind of controversy when she dated the much older, Dominic Warner (Shane Cortese). She was portrayed by Anna Hutchison until 2004.

Harry Warner

Harry Warner (né Thompson-Warner) first appeared in May 2002. He was portrayed by Reid Walker from 2009 to 2018.

References

2002
, Shortland Street